Plesiothornipos is an ichnogenus of mammal footprint.

See also

 List of dinosaur ichnogenera

References

Trace fossils